Claudio Celon (born 19 April 1961) is a sailor from Camogli, Italy, who represented his country at the 1996 Summer Olympics in Savannah, United States as crew member in the Soling. With helmsman Mario Celon and fellow crew member Gianni Torboli they took the 10th place.

References

Living people
1961 births
Sailors at the 1984 Summer Olympics – Flying Dutchman
Sailors at the 1988 Summer Olympics – Flying Dutchman
Sailors at the 1996 Summer Olympics – Soling
Olympic sailors of Italy
Sportspeople from the Province of Genoa

Italian male sailors (sport)